John Morgan Thomas (Oct 12, 1926 - Feb 4, 2012) was United States Assistant Secretary of State for Administration from November 23, 1973, to June 28, 1979.

References
List of Assistant Secretaries
 obituary

United States Assistant Secretaries of State
1926 births
2012 deaths